Natirar is an estate spanning  in Peapack-Gladstone, Far Hills and Bedminster, in Somerset County, New Jersey, United States. Its name is a reverse spelling of Raritan. The complex was built between 1910 and 1912. In 2003 it was sold by the estate of Hassan II, late King of Morocco, to Somerset County, New Jersey, and is now administered by the Somerset County Park Commission. Approximately  of the estate have been leased to develop that portion of the estate (which includes the mansion, stable/carriage barn and most of the other outbuildings) into an exclusive hotel, spa, restaurant complex.

Location
The  driveway lies within the  estate that occupies portions of three municipalities. The core buildings are south of Highland Avenue, east of Main Street/Peapack Road, north of the North Branch of the Raritan River and west of Lake Road. The main entrance, once at the Far Hills train station, is now just over the town line, nearly at the spot where Main Street (Peapack Road) crosses the North Branch of the Raritan River and New Jersey Transit's Gladstone Branch.

Uses
This was originally an estate for Kate Macy Ladd (1863–1945), heiress to a Massachusetts whaling, shipping and oil fortune, and her husband, Walter Graeme Ladd (1857–1933). After Mrs. Ladd's death, a convalescent home for women that she had started at Natirar in 1908 assumed control of the property. Under the terms of her husband's will, that home, run by an entity he had started called the Kate Macy Ladd Fund, was to be sold 50 years after his death. True to form, in 1983 the facility was disbanded, its assets distributed in equal parts to five educational institutions. The property was sold for $7.5 million to Hassan II, the King of Morocco, who visited the property infrequently due to its use as a permanent residence for his children as they attended Princeton University. After the king's death, ownership passed to his son, King Mohammed VI, who sold the property in 2003 to Somerset County, New Jersey (the county government is known as the Board of Chosen Freeholders) for $22 million.

The county leased  of the property, including all of the core buildings pictured here, to a local resident, Bob Wojtowicz. He began plans to renovate the buildings. The carriage house on the property was converted into a restaurant known as 90 Acres, and an attached garage was converted to a cooking school for public classes and events. It opened in late December 2009. Bob had partnered with Richard Branson from Virgin spa to convert the mansion to a resort location. Virgin's branding ended when Miraval Resorts became a partner with Bob Wojtowicz. The Miraval-branded resort does not currently have an opening date.

Natirar Park
Somerset County operates 404 acres as Natirar, a county park with 247 acres located in Peapack-Gladstone, 124 acres in Far Hills, and 40 acres in Bedminster. The parks features include areas of lawn and woodland, and river access to North Branch Raritan River. Peapack Brook also flows through the property.  The park also includes historic farm buildings and other residential structures and out-buildings dating from the mid-18th through mid-19th centuries which are not open to the public.

References

External links
 Natirar - official park site
  N A T I R A R (Official site)
 N A T I R A R-The complete History prepared by the Non-Profit Mr. Local History Project
 Estate of Catherine Everit Macy and Walter Graeme Ladd, Somerset County, N.J.: Natirar Estate. Held by the Department of Drawings & Archives, Avery Architectural & Fine Arts Library, Columbia University.

Bedminster, New Jersey
County parks in New Jersey
Far Hills, New Jersey
Parks in Somerset County, New Jersey
Peapack-Gladstone, New Jersey
Resorts in New Jersey